Klub Sportowy Górnik Radlin is a Polish sports club based in Radlin. It has football, volleyball, gymnastics, swimming and fencing sections. The volleyball team plays in the Polish Volleyball League (Polska Liga Siatkówki, PLS) and the football team has previously played in the Ekstraklasa.

History 
Górnik Radlin was founded in 1923.

From 1975 until 1997, the club took the name "Górnik Radlin" Wodzisław Śląski, as the Radlin was a district of the city of Wodzisław Śląski.

Volleyball

2003/2004 season 

2nd place in Seria B, promotion to PLS Seria A.

2004/2005 season 

The team will play Polish Volleyball League (Seria A).
Kadra III-liga – rozgrywki 2013/2014.
1.Barteczko Adam - rozgrywający - kapitan
2. Gilner Kamil - libero
3.Porwoł Robert - atakujący
4.Wowra Bartłomiej - libero
5. Graff Karol - rozgrywający
6.Kołodziejski Sebastian - przyjmujący
7.Koczwara Adrian - środkowy
8.Mielnik Mateusz - przyjmujący
9.Radomski Krzysztof - przyjmujący
10. Grzywacz Patryk - środkowy
11. Harazim Damian - przyjmujący
12.Olszewski Dawid - środkowy
13.Turek Sebastian - atakujący
15.Marcol Jarosław - rozgrywający
16.Kaczmarek Kamil - środkowy
I TRENER  - Marek Przybys

Football
Górnik Radlin's best performance in the Ekstraklasa was a second placing in the league in 1951.

See also 
 Volleyball in Poland
 Football in Poland
 Sports in Poland

References

Polish volleyball clubs
Sport in Silesian Voivodeship
Wodzisław County
Sports clubs established in 1923
1923 establishments in Poland
Football clubs in Silesian Voivodeship
Mining association football clubs in Poland